Renick James (born 21 August 1987) is a Belizean judoka.

He competed at the 2016 Summer Olympics in Rio de Janeiro, in the men's 90 kg, where he was defeated by Ovini Uera in the second round.

References

External links
 

1987 births
Living people
Belizean male judoka
Olympic judoka of Belize
Judoka at the 2016 Summer Olympics
People from Belize District